Phoberia atomaris, the common oak moth, is a species of moth in the family Erebidae. The species is found in North America, from Quebec and Ontario south to Florida, and west to Kansas and Texas.

The wingspan is about 38 mm. Adults are on wing from March to July depending on the location.

The larvae feed on Oak species, including Northern red oak.

External links
Images at mothphotographersgroup
Species info

Melipotini
Moths of North America